This is a list of Afghanistan first-class cricketers, correct as of 21 January 2013. First-class cricket matches are those between international teams or the highest standard of domestic teams in which teams have two innings each. Generally, matches are eleven players a side but there have been exceptions. Today all matches must be scheduled to have at least three days' duration; historically, matches were played to a finish with no pre-defined timespan. The list includes any player to have played for the Afghanistan national cricket team who has also played first-class cricket, whether for Afghanistan or another team. The list is in alphabetical order by first name, as is custom in cricket for players from Muslim countries.

See also

Afghanistan national cricket team
List of Afghanistan ODI cricketers
List of Afghanistan T20I cricketers

References
List of players for Afghanistan at CricketArchive